The ACM Virtual Reality International Conference (VRIC) is an annual conference on virtual reality organized by the Association for Computing Machinery. Papers are on a variety of topics, such as mixed reality, human-computer interaction, 3D interaction evaluation, and image analysis. Its proceedings are published in the ACM Digital Library. It is hosted and sponsored by ACM SIGGRAPH, Association française de réalité virtuelle, and Laval Virtual in city of Laval, France.

References

External links 
 
 Proceedings of the 2015 Virtual Reality International Conference (ACM Portal)

Computer science conferences
Human–computer interaction
Association for Computing Machinery conferences